Dhaka Transport Coordination Authority is the main government agency responsible for public transport in Dhaka, the capital of Bangladesh, and transport in most of Dhaka division. It is the government agency responsible for moderating and mediating negotiations between transport labor unions and transport owners. Under the Revised Strategic Transport Plan any changes to transport infrastructure will need approval from the Dhaka Transport Coordination Authority. It is also responsible for mass transport projects in Dhaka.

History
Dhaka Transport Coordination Authority was established on 2 September 2012. It traces its origins to Dhaka Transport Coordination Board which was established in 1998. The authority was formed through the  Dhaka Transport Coordination Authority Act, 2012. The authority has jurisdiction in Dhaka District, Gazipur District, Manikganj District, Munshiganj District, Narayanganj District and the cities corporations within them. In 2017 it launched Rapid Pass in Dhaka, a smart card payment system for Bangladesh Road Transport Corporation and Omama buses.

Transport Service Plan
Prime Minister Sheikh Hasina has directed the DSCC and Local Government and Rural Development (LGRD) Ministry to bring Dhaka's bus services under six companies, envisioned by late Annisul Huq, former mayor of Dhaka North.  According to late mayor Annisul Huq's plan, all private bus operators will come under the six companies and operate bus services on 22 major routes, instead of the 100 existing bus routes that make the city chaotic. The bus services are supposed to be in six colours – orange, blue, maroon, pink, violet, and green Bigstock. According to the Dhaka south mayor, the proposed six companies will run 4,000 buses on different routes. For this reason the authority has planned to recruit huge margin employee to control this service. Also controlled to the Dhaka City traffic jam, road accident, Transport Bus fitness and others unexpected situation.

References

Government agencies of Bangladesh
2012 establishments in Bangladesh
Organisations based in Dhaka
Transport in Dhaka
Transport authorities in Bangladesh
Intermodal transport authorities